The 1914 Indiana Hoosiers football team was an American football team that represented Indiana University Bloomington during the 1914 college football season. In their first season under head coach Clarence Childs, the Hoosiers compiled a 3–4 record, finished in eighth place in the Western Conference, and were outscored by their opponents by a combined total of 130 to 104.

Schedule

References

Indiana
Indiana Hoosiers football seasons
Indiana Hoosiers football